The city of Ulm, in the German state of Baden-Württemberg, was heavily bombed during the closing months of World War II. The first and heaviest raid, on 17 December 1944, left 707 people dead, 613 injured, and 25,000 homeless. Two large truck factories, Magirus-Deutz and Kässbohrer, were the primary targets.  There were several other important industries and some Wehrmacht barracks and depots.

During the 25-minute raid, 317 Avro Lancaster bombers and 13 de Havilland Mosquito light bombers dropped a total of 1,449 tons of bombs, starting in the city centre (Münsterplatz) and then creeping back to the west across the industrial and railway areas. The Gallwitz Barracks and several military hospitals were among 14 establishments destroyed. The city's historic Ulm Minster church suffered only minor damage. Two Lancasters were lost.

Subsequent raids on March 1 and April 19, 1945, by British and American aircraft, left a total of 632 dead. By the end of the war, 80 percent of the city center was destroyed. Only 1,763 out of 12,756 buildings remained intact.

References

Ulm
20th century in Baden-Württemberg
Ulm
Ulm
Ulm
Germany–United Kingdom military relations